The Cape Fear and Yadkin Valley Railway was a Southeastern railroad that operated in the Carolinas immediately after Reconstruction.  It ran from Mount Airy, North Carolina southeast through Greensboro and Fayetteville to the Atlantic port of Wilmington, North Carolina.  A significant branch also ran from Fayetteville south to Bennettsville, South Carolina.

History

The Cape Fear and Yadkin Valley Railway was created in 1879 with the consolidation of the Western Railroad and the Mount Airy Railroad.

By 1899, the Cape Fear and Yadkin Valley Railway was debt-ridden and bankrupt and was sold to the Southern Railway, where it was reorganized as a new company under the name Atlantic and Yadkin Railway, which remained a wholly owned subsidiary of the Southern Railway. 

The newly created Atlantic and Yadkin then sold back the southern half of the line from Sanford, North Carolina, to Wilmington to the Wilmington and Weldon Railroad, which was later reorganized as the Atlantic Coast Line Railroad (ACL) in 1899.  The Atlantic Coast Line Railroad operated their segment of the line as their Sanford Branch (E Branch west of Fayetteville and F Branch east of there).  The Atlantic Coast Line also took over the Bennettsville Branch (which became their G Branch).  Though, since the northern part of the Bennettsville Branch paralleled the ACL's main line, they abandoned the branch between Fayetteville and Parkton and connected the remaining branch to the main line at Parkton.  The Atlantic Coast Line Railroad became the Seaboard Coast Line Railroad in 1967, which became CSX Transportation in the 1980s.

The Cape Fear and Yadkin Valley Railway Passenger Depot at Fayetteville, North Carolina and the Rural Hall Depot at Rural Hall, North Carolina were listed on the National Register of Historic Places in 1983.

Current conditions
Today, parts of the original Cape Fear and Yadkin Valley Railway are still in service.  From Mount Airy to Rural Hall, the line is now operated by the Yadkin Valley Railroad, a shortline that also operates the former Southern Railway line from Rural Hall to North Wilkesboro.

The line is largely abandoned from Rural Hall to just northwest of Greensboro.  The Atlantic and Yadkin Greenway now runs on the former right of way northwest of Greensboro.

From Greensboro to Gulf, the line is still operated by Norfolk Southern Railway.

The segment from Cumnock to Sanford is now operated by the Atlantic and Western Railway.

CSX still operates the line from Spring Lake to just southeast of Fayetteville as well as a short discontinuous segment near Wilmington.

The Bennettsville Branch is still in service from Parkton to Red Springs and is now operated by the Red Springs & Northern Railroad.  The line was abandoned between Red Springs and McColl in 1973.

Stations

Main Line

Bennettsville Branch

Notes

References

Defunct South Carolina railroads
Defunct North Carolina railroads
Predecessors of the Atlantic Coast Line Railroad
Railway companies established in 1879
Railway companies disestablished in 1899